Antonio David Álvarez Rey (born 18 December 1994), sometimes known as Davo, is a Spanish professional footballer who plays for Eupen. Mainly a right winger, he can also play as a forward.

Club career
Born in Luarca, Asturias, Álvarez represented Luarca CF and Real Avilés CF as a youth. He made his senior debut with the latter's reserves on 26 February 2012, starting in a 0–2 Regional Preferente home loss against Valdesoto CF, and scored his first goal on 22 April in a 4–1 away routing of AD Universidad de Oviedo B.

In the 2012 summer, Álvarez moved to Real Oviedo and returned to the youth setup. He then featured rarely with the B-team in Tercera División before signing for fellow league team UP Langreo on 8 October 2013.

Álvarez subsequently represented fourth division sides Caudal Deportivo, Zamora CF and Oviedo B before joining Segunda División B side Rápido de Bouzas in July 2017. He moved to fellow third division side CCD Cerceda the following January, but returned to Zamora in July 2018 after suffering relegation.

On 3 July 2019, after scoring a career-best 20 goals, Álvarez returned to Langreo, with the club now in division three. On 13 May 2020, he agreed to a deal with UD Ibiza in the same category, and was the club's top goalscorer with ten goals during the campaign, as they achieved a first-ever promotion to Segunda División.

Álvarez made his professional debut at the age of 26 on 13 August 2021, coming on as a second-half substitute for Ekain Zenitagoia in a 0–0 away draw against Real Zaragoza.

On 3 June 2022, he signed a two-year contract with an extension option for Polish Ekstraklasa side Wisła Płock.

After a successful stint in Poland, with nine goals and three assists in 18 league appearances, Álvarez was transferred to Belgian side Eupen on 31 January 2023.

References

External links
 
 
 

1994 births
Living people
People from Valdés, Asturias
Spanish footballers
Footballers from Asturias
Association football wingers
Segunda División players
Segunda División B players
Tercera División players
Ekstraklasa players
Divisiones Regionales de Fútbol players
Belgian Pro League players
Real Avilés CF footballers
Real Oviedo Vetusta players
UP Langreo footballers
Caudal Deportivo footballers
Zamora CF footballers
Rápido de Bouzas players
CCD Cerceda players
UD Ibiza players
Wisła Płock players
K.A.S. Eupen players
Spanish expatriate footballers
Spanish expatriate sportspeople in Poland
Expatriate footballers in Poland
Spanish expatriate sportspeople in Belgium
Expatriate footballers in Belgium